Francis Parker Shepard (10 May 1897 – 25 April 1985) was an American sedimentologist most associated with his studies of submarine canyons and seafloor currents around continental shelves and slopes.

Early life and education
Shepard was born to a moderately wealthy family in Marbleheard, Massachusetts.  He studied geology under R. A. Daly at Harvard University, a period that was interrupted by service in the US Navy during the First World War.  After meeting his future wife, Elizabeth Buchner, he chose to study for his doctorate at the University of Chicago, close to her Milwaukee home.  There he worked alongside J. Harlan Bretz, Rollin D. Salisbury and Rollin T. Chamberlin (son of Thomas Chamberlin) on the structural geology of the Rocky Mountains, receiving his degree in 1922.

Career
After completing his degree, he became a geology instructor at the University of Illinois in 1922. He was promoted to full professor there in 1939, before formally resigning his professorship in 1945, having moved with his family to California in February 1942.

A fortuitous spell using a yacht belonging to his father, the head of Shepard Steamship Company, turned Shepard in the direction of marine geology. Examining the distribution of sediments on the New England shelf, he found evidence of the role of sea level change in the evolution of shelves.  After a sabbatical in 1933–1934 spent studying submarine canyons off the coast of California, Shepard in 1937 took another leave (lasting for a year and a half) from the University of Illinois and moved his family and two of his graduate students, Robert S. Dietz and Kenneth O. Emery, to the Scripps Institution of Oceanography in La Jolla.  There his work focused on the shelves off California and the Gulf of California, and the processes that shaped them.  Submarine canyons, he suggested, were initially carved by rivers when sea levels were lower during the recent Pleistocene epoch.

In the Second World War, Shepard again worked for the US Navy, where his expertise and knowledge of seafloors was used to assist submarine operations. In 1945 he became a professor of submarine geology at the Scripps Institute, working there until retiring from teaching in 1966. During this period, Shepard became director of an American Petroleum Institute project, studying sedimentation in the northern Gulf of Mexico between 1951 and 1960 (API Project 51).  Although officially retiring in 1966, Shepard continued to work, even after illness had forced him to remain at home.

Awards and honours
During his career Shepard received both the Wollaston Medal from the Geological Society of London (1966) and the Sorby Medal from the International Association of Sedimentologists (1978).  Since 1967, the Society for Sedimentary Geology have awarded the Francis P. Shepard Medal for Marine Geology in recognition of "Excellence in Marine Geology".

References

External links
 Autobiography, Scripps Institution of Oceanography
 Biographical entry, Scripps Institution of Oceanography
 Biographical entry, Geological Society of America
 Biographical entry, Encyclopædia Britannica
 Wollaston Medal winners, Geological Society of London
 Sorby Medal winners , International Association of Sedimentologists
 P. Shepard Medal for Marine Geology Francis P. Shepard Medal for Marine Geology and MEDALISTS winners, Society for Sedimentary Geology

1897 births
1985 deaths
20th-century American geologists
Harvard University alumni
University of Chicago alumni
University of Illinois Urbana-Champaign faculty
Wollaston Medal winners
History of the Gulf of California
People from Marblehead, Massachusetts